The McBrown Kitchen is a Ghanaian television program hosted by actress Nana Ama Mcbrown on United Television. It is a television cooking show that interviews celebrities whiles  cooking their favorite dishes.

Awards and honors

Appearance
The following personalities have been interviewed on the show.

James Gardiner
Benedicta Gafah
Conan O'Brien
Sam Richardson
Efia Odo
Amerado
Empress Gifty
Bill Asamoah
Kwaku Manu
Christiana Awuni
Wayoosi
Prince David Osei
Naana Hayford
Papa Kumasi
Nana Agyakoma Dufie
Kafui Danku
Kwaku Twamasi
Nana Ansah Kwao IV
Joyce Blessing
Funny Face
Akumaa Mama Zimbi
Flowking Stone
Yvonne Nelson
Gloria Safo
Kalybos
Nikki Samonas
Appietus
Adjetey Annan
Martha Ankomah
Stephenie Benson
Maame Dokono
Coded (4X4)
Lydia Forson
Sandra Ankobiah
Maame Serwaa
Oheneyere Gifty Anti
Paa George 
Salma Mumin
Berla Mundi
Oboy Salinko
Cynthia Ampiadu
Christabel Ekeh
Vivian Jill 
Akua Donkor
Emelia Brobbey
Prophet Kumchacha
Obaapa Christy
Yvonne Okoro
Adwoa Smart
Ekow Smith Asante 
Hon. Abla Dzifa Gomashie
Moesha Buduong
Luckie Lawson
Fred Amugi
Ahuofe Patri
Koo Fori
Tracy Boakye
Paulina Oduro
KiDi
Ama Abebrese
Kofi B
Sista Afua
Wendy Shay
Kofi Kinaata
Shatta Michy
Evangelist Papa Shee
Joe Mettle
Ellen White
Juliet Ibrahim
Kwami Eugene
Evangelist Daina Asamoah
Daina Hamilton
Darko Vibes
Lady Prempeh
Becca
Joe Shortingo
Celestine Donkor
Obrafour
Akyere Bruwaa
Adina
Ajors
Stella Aba Seal
Article Wan
Yaw Tog
Portia Asare Boateng
Viviennie Achor
Kwame Afrifa Mensah
Edem
Bernard Aduse Poku
Too Sweet Annan
Kwadwo Sheldon

References

External links 

 Facebook Page
 Youtube Page

Television in Ghana
Ghanaian television shows
United Television Ghana original programming